Professor Victor On-kwok Li (born October 11, 1954) is an American Hong Kong academic. He is best known for his contributions to the development of Information technology. He received the Government of Hong Kong Bronze Bauhinia Star in 2001, and he is a fellow of Institute of Electrical and Electronics Engineers.

Prof. Li is currently chair professor and head of the Department of Electrical and Electronic Engineering of the University of Hong Kong (HKU). He also serves as Managing Director of Versitech Ltd. He is also on the boards of SUNeVision Ltd., China.com Ltd., and Anxin-China Holding Ltd. Prof. Li also chairs the Executive Committee, HKU Initiative on Clean Energy and Environment.

From 2007 to 2012, he served as Associate Dean of Engineering at HKU. Before joining HKU in 1997, he was a professor of electrical engineering (EE) at the University of Southern California (USC) and director of Communication Sciences Institute of USC. He chaired the Computer Communications Technical Committee of the IEEE Communications Society from 1987 to 1989, and the Los Angeles Chapter of the IEEE Information Theory Group from 1983 to 1985.

Prof. Li's doctoral adviser was Prof. Wilbur Davenport, who was a student of Prof. Robert Fano.

References

Fellow Members of the IEEE
1954 births
Living people
Massachusetts Institute of Technology alumni
Academic staff of the University of Hong Kong
University of Southern California faculty
Recipients of the Bronze Bauhinia Star